3701 may refer to:

The first year in the 38th century
3701 Purkyně asteroid
Hirth 3701 two stroke aircraft engine
Air Force 3701, presidential aircraft of the Republic of China